Bag is a village in Pest County, Hungary.

References

External links

  in Hungarian

Populated places in Pest County